The caisa is a musical instrument made of steel and wood. The steel section resembles the top of a steelpan and the wooden base section resembles a horn-like stand. The steel and wood are held together with a stretchy rope material; there is no direct contact between the steel and the wood. Sound is emitted from the gap between the steel and the wood and not from the horn at the base. The tone areas are hammered by hand and are usually in a pentatonic scale comprising ten to twelve notes. The central note is much deeper.

The latest version of the caisa consists solely of metal.

The instrument can be played either on the lap with the horn held between the legs or can be stood on its wooden base. The caisa is played with the hands in manner similar to that of the Hang, but it sounds more like a meditation pan. From the side, the instrument resembles a mushroom.

The caisa is made in Germany by Bill Brown.

Pitched percussion instruments